Adelaide Yaa Agyeiwaa Ntim (born 24 June 1971) is a Ghanaian politician. She has been the Member of Parliament representing the Nsuta-Kwaman-Beposo Constituency in the Ashanti Region since 7 January 2021.

Early life and education 
Adelaide Yaa Agyeiwaa Ntim was born on 24 June 1971 and hails from Nsuta-Ashanti. She holds two Diplomas - Pharmacy Assistant (2017), and Basic Criminal Law (2019).

Political career 
Ntim ousted the then member of parliament for the Nsuta-Kwaman-Beposo constituency, Kwame Asafu Adjei, in the June 2020 New Patriotic Party (NPP) Parliamentary Primaries to become the party's candidate for the December 2020 election. Prior to becoming a member of the Ghanaian Parliament, Ntim renounced her citizenship of the United States of America in August 2020. She won the December 2020 parliamentary election with 23,622 votes representing 71.7% of the total votes cast, beating her opponent Newman Dapaah of the National Democratic Congress(NDC) who obtained 9,321 votes representing 28.3% of the total valid votes cast.

Committees 
As a first timer in Parliament, she serves as the Vice Chairperson and a Member of the Foreign Affairs and Environment, Science and Technology Committees in parliament respectively.

Personal life 
She is a Christian.

Philanthropy 
In June 2021, Ntim funded abandoned school projects in Kruwi and Asuafu in the Nsuta-Kwaman-Beposo Constituency. She also presented equipment and tools such as sewing machines and hair dryers to seamstresses, tailors and beauticians. She also gave farm equipment, seedlings and money to farmer groups. Communities such as Abrewa Anko and Amangoase also received water systems.

References 

1971 births
Living people
Ghanaian MPs 2021–2025
New Patriotic Party politicians
People from Ashanti Region
Women members of the Parliament of Ghana
21st-century Ghanaian women politicians